Cho Joong-hoon (born January 27, 1976), better known by his stage name Cho PD, is a South Korean record producer, rapper, and the founder of record label Stardom Entertainment. Producing his own music for himself and his crew Stardom (his company's eponym), he rose to prominence through the internet then debuted in 1998. Later, he also would support other artists like Psy, Verbal Jint and a young Dok2 earlier in their careers. After twelve years, he briefly "retired" from music in 2010. However, he came out of retirement in 2011 with his two studio albums, State of the Art and Art of Business.

On November 23, 2018, Cho was found guilty of fraud by the Seoul Central District Court. The sentence concerned Cho withholding undisclosed assets worth ₩270,000,000 (approx. $238,116 USD) in July 2015 when he signed a contract to transfer the assets of Stardom Entertainment to a new unnamed company. These undisclosed funds were derived from Topp Dogg’s 2015 concert tour of Japan. Cho was given a two-year prison sentence, suspended for 3 years.

Since his sentencing, he made an attempt to reinvent his branding. In May 2019, he launched ChoCo Entertainment, which specializes in powering virtual AI-based K-pop idols.

Discography

Studio albums

Extended plays

Awards

Mnet Asian Music Awards

References

1976 births
Living people
Berklee College of Music alumni
English-language singers from South Korea
Korean Music Award winners
MAMA Award winners
People convicted of fraud
South Korean composers
South Korean electronic musicians
South Korean fraudsters
South Korean hip hop record producers
South Korean male rappers
South Korean prisoners and detainees
South Korean record producers